Mehdi Taj is an Iranian sports executive and administrator who is president of Football Federation Islamic Republic of Iran since August 2022 for second term.
 
Also he was president of the Iranian Football Federation from 2016 until 2019. As of May 2020, Mehdi has been appointed a member of the Asian Football Confederation Emergency Committee.

He was previously First Vice President of Iranian Football Federation (2008–2012), President of the Iran Football League Organization (2013–2016), Secretary of the Board of Sepahan (1992–1994, 2002–2006) and president of the club (1994–1999) and Board Chairman of the Foolad Metil. He was also editor-in-chief of Jahan Varzesh from 1991 until 2001. On 7 May 2016, he was elected as president of Iranian Football Federation with 51 votes, succeeding Ali Kafashian. He resigned on 30 December 2019 due to illness.

on 30 August 2022, Taj was elected as new president of Iran Football Federation for a two-year term. Taj won the three-candidate race with 51 votes.

References

External links 
 about Taj

1960 births
Living people
Sportspeople from Isfahan
Association football executives
Iranian sports executives and administrators
Sepahan S.C.
Islamic Revolutionary Guard Corps officers
Presidents of Iranian Football Federation